Zheng Zhihua (born 14 November 1961) is a Taiwanese singer. When he was two, he contracted polio and became permanently paralyzed from the waist down.  He started his career in the late 1980s and enjoyed great success and popularity during the early 1990s in both Taiwan and mainland China. He announced his retirement in January 1999, but in 2005 he reemerged.

Zheng's most famous songs are Sailor and Star Lighting. His other famous songs are 33 Pieces, Snail's House, and so on.

Zheng Zhihua now lives in Taipei.

Related mandopop/rock artists/bands
 Angus Tung
 Cui Jian
 Dou Wei
 Tang Dynasty (band)
 Wuyontana

Zheng is currently living in Taipei with his family.  He frequently travels to China to perform and oversee other business interests.

References

External links
 Union of Zheng's Fans (in Chinese)

1961 births
Living people
Musicians from Taipei
Taiwanese singer-songwriters
People with polio
National Taipei University of Technology alumni
20th-century Taiwanese  male singers